An unfair election is a concept used by national and international election monitoring groups to identify when the vote of the people for a government is not free and fair. Unfairness in elections encompasses all varieties of electoral fraud, voter suppression or intimidation, unbalanced campaign finance rules, and imbalanced access to the media. Unfair elections violate the right to vote, which is generally recognised as an essential element to a deliberative democracy and representative democracy.

History

Although some form of elections have been held since antiquity, in every society until 1893, large number of people were excluded based on their status, particularly slaves, poor, women, people with different skin colour, and people without formal education. The first democratic election in the modern sense was the 1893 general election in New Zealand, when women won the vote at the age of 21 like men, property qualifications were scrapped, and restrictions on Maori people voting were discarded. In the United Kingdom, some form of representation in government had been guaranteed since the Magna Carta 1215, but only for a tiny elite, and potentially vetoed by the Monarch. The Monarch's power was eliminated following the Glorious Revolution 1688, and then elections became progressively more democratic. As property qualifications were slowly phased out from 1832 to in 1918, women's suffrage became non-discriminatory in 1928, and the last vestiges of double voting were abolished in 1948. In the United States, elections for the Federal government were administered in each of the states. Around half of all successful constitutional amendments since the Revolution of 1776 concerned elections and the franchise. Slavery was abolished in 1865, universal suffrage for men in the United States House of Representatives was achieved over 1868 and 1870, direct elections to the Senate secured in 1913, women won the vote in 1920, and poll taxes levied by the states were banned in 1964. Around continental Europe, there were different speeds of progress. France had granted universal suffrage for men after the Revolutions of 1848, but did not extend the vote to women until 1944. After the First World War in Germany, the new Weimar Republic's constitution of 1919 guaranteed universal suffrage, overhauling the German Empire's system of three voting classes that depended on wealth, and its exclusion of women. However, democracy was abolished again in 1933 by the Nazi regime until the victory of the Allies in World War II.

In 1948, the Universal Declaration of Human Rights exhorted that "everyone has the right to take part in the government", that "the will of the people is the basis of the authority of government" and that "this will shall be expressed in periodic and genuine elections." In the post war process of decolonialisation, more and more countries became independent from the crumbling European Empires, and many introduced elections of some form, though many countries' transition slid abruptly back into authoritarian regimes. The Soviet Union and countries behind the Iron Curtain had no free elections, until the fall of the Berlin Wall in 1989. After that a majority of countries around the world have moved toward democratic electoral systems, at least on paper.

Aside from simply denying the vote by outright discrimination, or by curtailing the power of the democratically elected body, interest groups or governments seeking to usurp or hold onto power employed a variety of methods. An early case of electoral fraud was in an election to the county of Northamptonshire in England in 1768, when three earls spent more than £100,000 each to buy votes from voters to win their seats. Voter intimidation was widespread in the March 1933 German federal election, immediately before the Nazi party abolished Parliament's powers. Hitler had become Chancellor at the start of 1933 in a coalition agreement, and with control over the police, opposition party members and campaigners were beaten up and imprisoned throughout the voting process. As electoral systems became more mature, the focus of unfairness turned toward campaign finance and media bias. Almost every country in the developed world introduced limits on the amount that could be spent by any particular candidate in an election. The large exception was the United States, because a majority of judges on the US Supreme Court who were appointed by the Republican Party continued to strike down campaign finance limits as unconstitutional from 1976. A majority of countries also have some form of media regulation, so that news coverage has to be impartial and accurate in its treatment of political issues. Regulation may also extend to who owns news and television organisations, so that the power to grant access information channels is not unduly limited.

Free and fair elections

A free and fair election has the following characteristics:
Equal voting rights, without unreasonable restrictions
Freedom of association for political groups
Parity of resources among political groups to persuade
An informed debate, with equal opportunity to express a view
The government's power is not unduly curtailed by the constitution or international agreements
The elected government can take legislative action to enact its promises
Electoral Commission
First past the post, proportional representation, preferential voting

Unfair practices

Intimidation and suppression

Electoral fraud

Campaign finance

Bowman v United Kingdom (1998) 26 EHRR 1, distributing vast quantities of anti-abortion material in contravention to election spending laws
Political Parties, Elections and Referendums Act 2000 and Political Parties and Elections Act 2009
Buckley v. Valeo, 424 U.S. 1 (1976)
Randall v. Sorrell, 548 U.S. 230 (2006)
Citizens United v. Federal Election Commission, 558 U.S. 310 (2010)

Media access

Public service broadcaster
Fairness rule

Manipulation and access
 Gerrymandering
 Ballot access

Examples
Below are some examples widely considered by observers to be unfair, excluding uncontested elections.

Afghanistan
 2009: Hamid Karzai was the most popular candidate, despite winning just under half of the vote. However, there were widespread claims of electoral fraud.

Belarus

Under Alexander Lukashenko, The elections in Belarus have been deemed unfair. The only Belarusian election deemed free and fair was the 1994 Belarusian presidential election, the first election in the country since the dissolution of the Soviet Union in 1991.
8 2006: Lukashenko won over 80% of the vote undemocratically.
 2001: Lukashenko won over 75% of the vote undemocratically.
 2010: Lukashenko won over 80% of the vote undemocratically. He was congratulated for his re-election by China, Russia, Syria and Vietnam. The European Union and the United States issued a travel ban for Lukashenko.
 2015: Lukashenko won over 80% of the vote in democratically.
 2020: Lukashenko won over 80% of the vote. This election was considered unfair by most international observers. Lukashenko received congratulations from the following countries: Armenia, Azerbaijan, Burundi, China, Cuba, Eritrea, Kazakhstan, Kyrgyzstan, Moldova, Myanmar, Nicaragua, North Korea, Oman, Russia, Syria, Tajikistan, Turkey, Uzbekistan, Venezuela and Vietnam, as well as the partially-recognised states of Abkhazia and South Ossetia. The election result was not accepted by the following countries: Albania, Australia, Austria, Belgium, Bosnia and Herzegovina, Bulgaria, Canada, Croatia, the Czech Republic, Denmark, Estonia, Finland, France, Germany, Greece, Hungary, Ireland, Italy, Latvia, Lithuania, Luxembourg, Montenegro, the Netherlands, North Macedonia, Poland, Portugal, Romania, Serbia, Slovakia, Slovenia, Spain, Sweden, the United Kingdom and the United States. Iceland, Japan, Norway and Ukraine questioned the legitimacy of the elections, while Afghanistan, Argentina, Bolivia, Brazil, Chile, Costa Rica, Fiji, Ghana, Israel, the Marshall Islands, Mexico, Micronesia, Monaco, New Zealand, Peru, San Marino, South Korea, Switzerland and Uruguay criticised the government's response to the election.

China
 1923: The Zhili clique, led by Cao Kun, won over 80% of the vote undemocratically.

Equatorial Guinea
 2022: The Democratic Party of Equatorial Guinea, led by Teodoro Obiang Nguema Mbasogo, won over 95% of the vote undemocratically.

Hungary
 1947: The Hungarian Communist Party, led by Mátyás Rákosi, won over 20% of the vote undemocratically.

India

Regional elections
 1987 (Jammu and Kashmir): The Jammu & Kashmir National Conference, led by Farooq Abdullah, won the election, however there were widespread claims of electoral fraud.

Iran

Most elections that have been held in Iran have been considered unfair.
 2009: The Alliance of Builders of Islamic Iran, led by Mahmoud Ahmadinejad, won over 60% of the vote undemocratically, resulting in global condemnation and protests.

Liberia
 1927: Charles D. B. King won over 96% of the vote in an extreme example of a sham election.

Mexico
 1929: The Institutional Revolutionary Party, led by Pascual Ortiz Rubio, won over 90% of the vote undemocratically.
 All other elections from 1929 to 1982.

Nazi Germany
 1933: The Nazi Party, led by Adolf Hitler, used violent practices against leftists. Hitler eventually won the vote and rose to power.

Pakistan
 1990: The Pakistan Muslim League, led by Nawaz Sharif, won over 35% of the vote, however allegations of electoral fraud were widespread. The Supreme Court of Pakistan later ruled that the elections were rigged.

Philippines
 1986: PDP–Laban, led by Corazon Aquino, won over 45% of the presidential vote and Aquino was elected President. The Nacionalista Party, led by Salvador Laurel, won over 45% of the vice presidential vote and Laurel became Vice President. The election, which was a snap election, was widely considered to be fraudulent.

Poland
 1947: The communist Front of National Unity, led by Bolesław Bierut, undemocratically won over 80% of the vote by a landslide victory.

Portugal
 1958: The National Union, led by Americo Thomaz, won over 75% of the vote. There were many reports of electoral fraud.

Romania
 1946: The Ploughmen's Front, led by Petru Groza, won almost 70% of the vote undemocratically.

Russia
 2018: Vladimir Putin won over 75% of the vote, however due to the Russian annexation of Crimea in 2014, many Western countries did not recognise the results of the election in Crimea.

Syria
Under Bashar Al-Assad, elections in Syria are not free or fair according to most international observers.
 2014: Al-Assad won over 90% of the vote undemocratically.
 2021: Al-Assad won over 95% of the vote undemocratically.

Turkey
 June 2015: See electoral fraud and violence during the June 2015 Turkish general election.

Ukraine
 2004: Viktor Yushchenko won over half of the vote, however allegations of electoral fraud were widespread. The Supreme Court of Ukraine later ruled that the elections were rigged.

Venezuela

 1957: Dictator Marcos Pérez Jiménez announced a referendum, without new elections, asking voters if they would approve that he remained in power. 
 2018: Incumbent President Nicolás Maduro was declared the winner of the election, although this is widely disputed and considered undemocratic by many countries. Most of the Western world recognised the social democratic Guadió-led National Assembly over Maduro's authoritarian socialist regime.

See also
List of next general elections
Vote splitting

Notes

External links
OSCE, Election Observation Handbook (6th edn 2010)

Electoral fraud